All in Time is the debut album by Canadian singer-songwriter Jim Cuddy. It was released by WEA on September 8, 1998. The album peaked at number 38 on the RPM Top Albums chart.

Track listing
All songs written by Jim Cuddy.
"Second Son" – 4:23
"Whistler" – 5:06
"Disappointment" – 4:30
"Too Many Hands" – 5:12
"New Year's Eve" – 6:33
"All in Time" – 5:09
"Slide Through Your Hands" – 5:26
"I'll Make Believe It's You" – 4:23
"Trouble" – 3:59
"Making My Way to You" – 3:30
"Everybody Cries" – 5:05

Chart performance

References

1998 debut albums
Jim Cuddy albums